Malaya Ivanovka is a rural locality (a selo) and the administrative center of Maloivanovskoye Rural Settlement, Dubovsky District, Volgograd Oblast, Russia. The population was 670 as of 2010. There are 4 streets.

Geography 
Malaya Ivanovka is located 55 km northwest of Dubovka (the district's administrative centre) by road. Loznoye is the nearest rural locality.

References 

Rural localities in Dubovsky District, Volgograd Oblast
Tsaritsynsky Uyezd